Polarized light microscopy can mean any of a number of optical microscopy techniques involving polarized light. Simple techniques include illumination of the sample with polarized light. Directly transmitted light can, optionally, be blocked with a polariser orientated at 90 degrees to the illumination. More complex microscopy techniques which take advantage of polarized light include differential interference contrast microscopy and interference reflection microscopy. Scientists will often use a device called a polarizing plate to convert natural light into polarized light.

These illumination techniques are most commonly used on birefringent samples where the polarized light interacts strongly with the sample and so generating contrast with the background. Polarized light microscopy is used extensively in optical mineralogy.

Although the invention of the polarizing microscope is typically attributed to David Brewster around 1815, Brewster clearly acknowledges the priority of Henry Fox Talbot, who published his work in 1834.

See also
 Michel-Levy chart
 Petrographic microscope

References

External links 
 Polarized light microscope (Université Paris Sud)

Geology
Optical microscopy techniques
Petrology